Derwentside College is a further education college based in Consett, County Durham, England. It is the major provider of vocational post-16 education and training in the former district of Derwentside.

The Principal and Chief Executive is Chris Todd, who took over from Karen Redhead in 2019.

The college's inspection report in 1997 summarised its history as: "Derwentside College was established as a tertiary college in 1986 following the decision of Durham Local Education Authority (LEA) to bring together the activities of Consett Technical College and the sixth forms of five local schools".

References

External links
 Derwentside College on the Ofsted website
 Official website

Further education colleges in County Durham
Educational institutions established in 1986
1986 establishments in England
Consett